Plushophilia (from "plushie" and "-philia") is a paraphilia involving stuffed toy animals. Many plushophiles modify their plushies with a hole or holes reminiscent of those found in sex toys, to allow them to sexually interact with their plushies. Plushophiles are sometimes called plushies, although this term (plushies) can also refer to non-sexual stuffed toy animal enthusiasts, and to stuffed toy animals in general. It is a form of object sexuality.

Furry fandom 
Plushophilia is sometimes assumed to be a practice common within furry fandom, due in part to a 2001 article by Vanity Fair that linked various members of the furry community with plushophilia.  A 1998 survey of 360 members of the furry community suggested less than one percent (that is, fewer than four people) attested to being plushophiles.

Pornography and sexual activity involving animal anthropomorphism (including plushophilia and paraphilias involving fursuits and cartoon animals) is known in the furry fandom community as "yiff" (and sexual acts as "yiffing").

Being in another form 
Anne Lawrence has proposed that sexual arousal that depends upon imagining one's self as plush or "representations of anthropomorphic animal characters in animated cartoons" be termed autoplushophilia. Paraphilic interests that involve being in another form have been referred to as erotic target location errors.

See also
Animal roleplay#Erotic scenarios
Fur fetishism

References

External links 
 "Museum of Sex Exhibits Modified Plush Toys" at WikiFur

Paraphilias
Sexuality and society
Sexual attraction
Sexual fetishism
Sexual roleplay